

MaB-flocs 

Microalgae do not settle by gravity, therefore expensive harvesting techniques must be applied. This is a major bottleneck of microalgal technology. Bioflocculation of microalgae and bacteria addresses this.

MaB-flocs or Microalgal Bacterial flocs settle by gravity, up to density of 20 g per liter. This is a major improvement for microalgal technology for wastewater treatment.

Currently, MaB-flocs are being applied for sewage treatment on lab and pilot scale in Germany, New Zealand and Belgium.  The idea is to scavenge nutrients such as nitrogen and phosphorus from the wastewater, sometimes combined with flue gas treatment.

Nutritional evaluation of such microbial protein or single cell protein as an unconventional protein feedstuff or ingredient in artificial animal feeds have gained much importance lately. Its nutritional strengths and bottlenecks are much described lately.

References

External links 
  

Environmental engineering